Ms. Marvel is the name of several fictional superheroes appearing in comic books published by Marvel Comics. The character was originally conceived as a female counterpart to Captain Marvel. Like Captain Marvel, most of the bearers of the Ms. Marvel title gain their powers through Kree technology or genetics. Marvel has published four ongoing comic series titled Ms. Marvel, with the first two starring Carol Danvers and the third and fourth starring Kamala Khan. The Carol Danvers version was the highest-ranked female character on IGNs Top Avengers list, coming in at #11.

Carol Danvers 

Carol Danvers, the first character to use the moniker Ms. Marvel, first appeared in Marvel Super-Heroes #13 (March 1968) by writer Roy Thomas and artist Gene Colan as a non-superpowered officer in the United States Air Force. After being caught in an explosion with the Kree superhero Captain Marvel in Captain Marvel #18 (November 1969), Danvers resurfaces in Ms. Marvel #1 (January 1977) with super powers resulting from the explosion, which caused her DNA to merge with Captain Marvel's. As Ms. Marvel, Danvers becomes a mainstay of the superhero team The Avengers, beginning in The Avengers #171 (May 1978). Danvers goes on to use the codenames Binary and Warbird. In July 2012, Danvers assumes the mantle Captain Marvel in honor of its deceased, original bearer, Mar-Vell, after Captain America tells her that Mar-Vell would want her to have it.

Sharon Ventura 

Sharon Ventura, the second character to use the pseudonym Ms. Marvel, first appeared in The Thing #27 (September 1985), by Mike Carlin and Ron Wilson, as a stunt performer with the Thunderiders, where she met The Thing. In The Thing #35 (May 1986), Ventura volunteered for Power Broker's experiment to receive superpowers in order to join the Unlimited Class Wrestling Federation with The Thing, taking the name Ms. Marvel. Ventura later joins the Fantastic Four herself in Fantastic Four #307 (October 1987) and, after being hit by cosmic rays in Fantastic Four #310 (January 1988), Ventura's body mutates into a similar appearance to that of The Thing and receives the nickname She-Thing.

Karla Sofen 

Dr. Karla Sofen, the supervillain known as Moonstone, first appeared as the gun moll of Doctor Faustus, in Captain America #192 (December 1975) by Marv Wolfman and Frank Robbins. In The Incredible Hulk vol. 2 #228 (October 1978), Sofen becomes the psychiatrist of the villain Moonstone, also known as Lloyd Bloch. Sofen tricks Bloch into giving her the meteorite that empowers him, and she adopts both the name and abilities of Moonstone. During the "Dark Reign" storyline, Sofen joins Norman Osborn's group of Avengers, known as the Dark Avengers, as the doppelganger of the previous Ms. Marvel, Carol Danvers, receiving a costume similar to Danvers' original (Danvers wore the Warbird costume at the time). Sofen becomes the title character of the Ms. Marvel series beginning in issue #38 (June 2009) until Danvers takes the title back in issue #47 (January 2010).

Kamala Khan 

Kamala Khan, created by Sana Amanat, G. Willow Wilson, and Adrian Alphona, is the fourth character to take the name Ms. Marvel. Khan first appeared in Captain Marvel #14 (August 2013) and is a 16-year-old Pakistani-American from Jersey City, New Jersey, who idolizes Carol Danvers. Khan was given her own Ms. Marvel series, which premiered in February 2014, becoming Marvel Comics' first Muslim character to headline her own comic book. The first collected volume of this series, Ms. Marvel Volume 1: No Normal, won the 2015 Hugo Award for Best Graphic Story.

Ms. Marvel, a live-action television series centered on the Kamala Khan version of the character, debuted on Disney+ on June 8, 2022, as part of the Marvel Cinematic Universe. Khan is played by Iman Vellani. Vellani will reprise her role in the live-action film The Marvels (2023).

References 

Comics about women
Feminist comics
Characters created by John Buscema
Characters created by Gerry Conway
Set index articles on comics
Comics characters introduced in 1977
Marvel Comics female superheroes
Articles about multiple fictional characters